The Attorney General of the State of Colorado is the chief legal officer for the U.S. state of Colorado and the head of the Colorado Department of Law, a principal department of the Colorado state government. It is an elected position with a four-year term, and follows the same schedule as election of the governor. The incumbent Colorado Attorney General is Democrat Phil Weiser, who was elected in November 2018 to a four-year term that began on January 8, 2019.

The Department of Law has seven sections: Appellate, Natural Resources and Environmental, Consumer Protection, State Services, Civil Litigation and Employment Law, Criminal Justice, Revenue & Utilities, and Business & Licensing.

List of Colorado Attorneys General

From 1873 to 1877 the Attorney General position was filled by the U.S. Attorney due to lack of funding by the territorial government. In 1876 Colorado was admitted to the Union as a State.

References

External links
Colorado Attorney General official website
Colorado Attorney General articles at Legal Newsline Legal Journal
News and Commentary at FindLaw
Colorado Revised Statutes at Law.Justia.com
U.S. Supreme Court Opinions - "Cases with title containing: State of Colorado" at FindLaw
Colorado Bar Association
Colorado Attorney General Cynthia Coffman profile at National Association of Attorneys General
Press releases by year at Colorado Attorney General's office

1861 establishments in Colorado Territory